The National Aviation Day (August 19) is a United States national observation that celebrates the development of aviation.

The holiday was established in 1939 by Franklin Delano Roosevelt, who issued a presidential proclamation which designated the anniversary of Orville Wright's birthday to be National Aviation Day (Mr. Wright, born in 1871, was still alive when the proclamation was first issued, and would live another nine years).  The proclamation was codified (USC 36:I:A:1:118), and it allows the sitting US President to proclaim August 19 as National Aviation Day each year, if desired.  Their proclamation may direct all federal buildings and installations to fly the US Flag that day, and may encourage citizens to observe the day with activities that promote interest in aviation.

History 

In 2014 Rockstar Games commemorated the holiday by releasing aviation themed downloadable content for Grand Theft Auto V. 

Air shows on or near the time of National Aviation Day for August 2018 and into September, include:
Chicago Air and Water Show
Atlantic City Airshow
Canadian International Air Show
Cleveland National Air Show
New York Air Show

The Chicago Air and Water show will host a NASA village in 2018. The NASA village, active for August 17 to 19, 2018 also celebrates the 60th anniversary of NASA and includes information about projects like the Space Launch System, a large rocket under development in the 2010s. As part of the National Aviation Day festivities at the North beach location, NASA will open its Journey to Tomorrow traveling exhibit.

External links
NASA - 2018 National Aviation Day

See also
Wright Brothers Day and Pan American Aviation Day (both on December 17)
National Aerospace Week (U.S. week for aviation)

References

August observances
Aviation in the United States
Public holidays in the United States
Wright brothers
1939 establishments in the United States
Recurring events established in 1939